Faryd Camilo Mondragón Alí (born 21 June 1971) is a Colombian retired professional footballer who played as a goalkeeper.

Since his debut in 1993, he has played over 50 times for the Colombia national team. He was named in the Colombia squads for the 1992 Olympics, two Copa América tournaments, two CONCACAF Gold Cups, and the World Cups of 1994, 1998 and 2014. On 24 June 2014, Mondragón made history by becoming the oldest player to play a FIFA World Cup match at the age of 43 years and 3 days, a record that was broken four years later by 45-year-old Egyptian goalkeeper Essam El-Hadary.

Club career

Born in Cali, Mondragón is of Lebanese descent.

He began his career began at Deportivo Cali, and he moved to Independiente Santa Fe and then Cerro Porteño in Paraguay. Mondragon held a contract with Cerro Porteño until May 1993. Mondragon's deal with Cerro Porteño was a six-month loan with the option to buy for USD $700 thousand. During his stay at Cerro Porteño, he lived in the Hotel Excelsior in Asunción. In the 1993 Cerro Porteño team, Mondragon was colleagued with Paraguayans Carlos Gamarra, Francisco Arce, Estanislao Struway, Virgilio Ferreira, Ecuadorian Luis Capurro and Brazilians Alex Rossi, Silvio Wielewski, Carlos Antonio Chaves and Luís Carlos Carvalho dos Reis. On 23 March 1993, it was announced that Mondragón would join Argentine club River Plate when Cerro Porteño finished its participation in the Copa Libertadores. Following a Copa Libertadores game for Cerro Porteno against Newell's Old Boys in Rosario, Mondragon flew to Buenos Aires to sign his contract and Cerro Porteño discarded the possibility of permanently signing Mondragon cause his cost was too high.

His career took off when he joined the Argentine first division side Argentinos Juniors in 1993, and then made his international debut for Colombia. The following year he moved to Club Atlético Independiente where he won, among other titles, the 1995 Supercopa Libertadores against Flamengo. Apart from some brief periods, he largely stood at the club until 2001.

He was the man behind the FC Metz's escape from relegation from Ligue 1 at the end of the 2000–01 season. However, he was convicted of using a false Greek passport and despite the mitigating circumstances (the passport would have been provided by shysters and FC Metz had not reached the limit of players outside the EU), Mondragón was not allowed to play in France and had to leave the country.

Mondragón represented Turkish power Galatasaray from 2001 to 2007, where he won two Süper Lig titles in 2002 and 2006. He was appreciated by the fans for his many saves and his commitment to the success of the team, and also become known for his prayers before and during games. He came to the fore in many European matches and was selected Player of the week in the Champions League two times.

Mondragón transferred from Istanbul to 1. FC Köln in May 2007. After arriving at his new club, he was forced to compete with established Köln goalkeeper Stefan Wessels for a spot in the starting eleven. One of the reasons that he chose 1. FC Köln it was because the current coach Christoph Daum was working there. After an intense pre-season, Mondragón was named as the new number one for 1. FC Köln. This resulted in Wessels leaving the club for Everton in England. Since Wessels departure, Mondragón established a first choice goalkeeper for the club until Mondragón was relegated to the bench after an altercation with Zvonimir Soldo over his desire to go on international duty. This resulted in Mondragón being sent home from the team hotel and being replaced by young Croatian stopper Miro Varvodić.

His contract with Köln was terminated with effect from 31 December 2010, the reason being Mondragón's desire to play in the MLS.

He spent the 2011 season with Philadelphia Union of Major League Soccer, where he was successful in providing leadership to a young team. On 30 January 2012, Deportivo Cali announced Mondragón had signed a one-year contract to finish his career with his original professional club. He retired after two and a half seasons back at the club.

International career
After making his debut against Venezuela in 1993, Mondragón was a member of the Colombia national teams that competed at the 1992 Summer Olympics and the 1994 and 1998 FIFA World Cup. During the 1998 World Cup, he started in goal for all three of their games, including the final match against England. Despite conceding two goals, he made some impressive saves and in doing so kept the score down to 2–0, with the BBC's South American football correspondent Tim Vickery saying that Mondragón was "single-handedly responsible for the fact that England did not run up a cricket score". At the end of the game, Mondragón broke down in tears and David Seaman, England's goalkeeper, did his best to console him. According to German footballing legend Franz Beckenbauer, Mondragón had been the best goalkeeper of the first round.

Along with Carlos Valderrama, the country's most capped player, Mondragón is the only Colombian to have participated in five FIFA World Cup qualification campaigns. In 2010, he was recalled to the Colombian squad at the age of 39 after a five-year absence from international football. In 2014, he was named in Colombia's squad for the 2014 FIFA World Cup, making him the oldest player at the tournament, and in World Cup history, at the age of 43, and the only squad member at the 1994 FIFA World Cup. He is also the only player to have participated in 6 different World Cup qualifying campaigns since 1993. By coming on as a substitute in the 85th minute of the final group game against Japan on 24 June 2014, he became the oldest player ever to play in a World Cup game at the age of 43 years and 3 days old, surpassing the record set by Roger Milla for Cameroon at the 1994 World Cup. Mondragón gave a very emotional interview afterwards, expressing his gratitude to have been given the opportunity to represent Colombia one last time at a World Cup. His record for oldest player in World Cup history was broken four years later at the 2018 World Cup by 45-year-old Egyptian goalkeeper Essam El-Hadary. Since Mondragón's last World Cup finals appearance prior to 2014 was in 1998, he also set a record for longest gap between two finals appearances.

After Colombia's elimination to the host country Brazil in the quarter-finals, Mondragón officially confirmed his retirement from football and thanked the fans and nation for the support after stating, "This is my last stadium as a professional player. I'm proud to be part of this wonderful group. Thank you all for the years of support.".

Personal life
Mondragón is of Lebanese descent. His first name Faryd means "unique or unmatched" in Arabic. He is a Maronite and has said so publicly along with making the sign of the cross on multiple occasions before matches.

Career statistics

Club

International

Honours
Independiente
Recopa Sudamericana: 1995
Supercopa Libertadores: 1995

Galatasaray
Süper Lig: 2001–02, 2005–06
Turkish Cup: 2004–05

Deportivo Cali
Superliga Colombiana: 2014

See also
FIFA World Cup records

References

External links

 
 PlayMaker Stats Profile
 Argentine Primera statistics at Fútbol XXI 

1971 births
Living people
Footballers from Cali
Colombian footballers
Colombian people of Lebanese descent
Deportivo Cali footballers
Real Cartagena footballers
Independiente Santa Fe footballers
Cerro Porteño players
Argentinos Juniors footballers
Club Atlético Independiente footballers
Real Zaragoza players
FC Metz players
Galatasaray S.K. footballers
1. FC Köln players
Philadelphia Union players
Deportivo Cali
Association football goalkeepers
Olympic footballers of Colombia
Footballers at the 1992 Summer Olympics
Colombia international footballers
1994 FIFA World Cup players
1997 Copa América players
1998 FIFA World Cup players
2003 CONCACAF Gold Cup players
2005 CONCACAF Gold Cup players
2014 FIFA World Cup players
Colombian expatriate footballers
Expatriate footballers in Germany
Expatriate footballers in France
Expatriate footballers in Spain
Expatriate footballers in Turkey
Expatriate footballers in Argentina
Expatriate footballers in Paraguay
Expatriate soccer players in the United States
Categoría Primera A players
Paraguayan Primera División players
Argentine Primera División players
La Liga players
Ligue 1 players
Süper Lig players
Bundesliga players
2. Bundesliga players
Major League Soccer players
Major League Soccer All-Stars
Colombian expatriate sportspeople in France
Colombian expatriate sportspeople in the United States
Colombian expatriate sportspeople in Turkey
Colombian expatriate sportspeople in Germany
Colombian expatriate sportspeople in Spain
Colombian expatriate sportspeople in Paraguay
Sportspeople of Lebanese descent